Barok is an Austronesian language spoken in New Ireland, Papua New Guinea.

References

Sources
 

Languages of New Ireland Province
Meso-Melanesian languages